The 2007 Speedway Grand Prix of Germany was the eleventh race of the 2007 Speedway Grand Prix season. It took place on 13 October in the Veltins-Arena stadium in Gelsenkirchen, Germany.

Starting positions draw 

(7) Matej Žagar (Slovenia)
(16) Christian Hefenbrock (Germany)
(15) Chris Harris (United Kingdom)
(8) Tomasz Gollob (Poland)
(5) Leigh Adams (Australia)
(6) Hans N. Andersen (Denmark)
(3) Nicki Pedersen (Denmark)
(1) Jason Crump (Australia)
(4) Andreas Jonsson (Sweden)
(10) Antonio Lindbäck (Sweden) → (19) Peter Karlsson (Sweden)
(13) Wiesław Jaguś (Poland)
(12) Bjarne Pedersen (Denmark)
(9) Jarosław Hampel (Poland) → (20) Kai Laukkanen (Finland)
(2) Greg Hancock (United States)
(14) Rune Holta (Poland)
(11) Scott Nicholls (United Kingdom)
(17) Martin Smolinski (Germany)
(18) Tobias Kroner (Germany)

Heat details

Heat after heat 
 Hefenbrock, Žagar, Gollob, Harris
 Andersen, Crump, N.Pedersen, Adams
 Jonsson, Karlsson, Jaguś, B.Pedersen
 Hancock, Nicholls, Holta, Laukkanen
 Adams, Žagar, Jonsson, Laukkanen
 Hancock, Andersen, Karlsson, Hefenbrock
 Jaguś, Holta, N.Pedersen, Harris
 B.Pedersen, Crump, Nicholls, Gollob
 Andersen, Nicholls, Žagar, Jaguś
 Holta, B.Pedersen, Adams, Hefenbrock
 Jonsson, Harris, Crump, Hancock
 Gollob, Karlsson, N.Pedersen, Laukkanen
 N.Pedersen, B.Pedersen, Hancock, Žagar
 Crump, Jaguś, Hefenbrock, Laukkanen
 Karlsson, Nicholls, Adams, Harris
 Jonsson, Gollob, Holta, Andersen
 Crump, Holta, Žagar, Karlsson
 N.Pedersen, Jonsson, Nicholls, Hefenbrock
 B.Pedersen, Harris, Andersen, Laukkanen
 Adams, Hancock, Gollob, Jaguś Semi-Finals:
 Hancock, Jonsson, Holta, N.Pedersen (4E)
 Adams, Crump, B.Pedersen, Andersen (F/X) Race-off (7th - 9th place in 2007 SGP):
 Holta, Nicholls, Harris (F) Final:
 Jonsson (6 points), Hancock (4), Crump (2), Adams (0)

Final standings

See also

References 

G
2007